U-30 may refer to one of the following German submarines:

 , was a Type U 27 submarine launched in 1913 and that served in the First World War until surrendered on 22 November 1918
 During the First World War, Germany also had these submarines with similar names:
 , a Type UB II submarine launched in 1915 and sunk on 13 August 1918
 , a Type UC II submarine launched in 1916 and sunk on 21 April 1917
 , a Type VIIA submarine that served in the Second World War until scuttled on 4 May 1945
 , a Type 206 submarine of the Bundesmarine that was launched in 1975

U-30 or U-XXX may also refer to:
 , a  submarine of the Austro-Hungarian Navy

Submarines of Germany